North Broward Preparatory School (NBPS) is a PK–12 private, boarding and day co-educational college-preparatory school in Coconut Creek, Florida, United States. It was founded in 1957 by James Montgomery.

The school was originally located in Lighthouse Point, Florida and relocated to its present location in the summer of 2004. The Coconut Creek campus of nearly  consists of an upper, middle and lower school. It became a member of the Meritas Family of Schools in 2005 and then Nord Anglia Education in June 2015.

History
The school was established in 1957 in Lighthouse Point. The school has grown to include grades Pre-K3 through 12. The boarding program has also expanded to include approximately 328 students.

Accreditation
North Broward Preparatory School is accredited by the Florida Council of Independent Schools and the Florida Kindergarten Council.

Membership
Southern Association of Independent Schools (SAIS)
Nord Anglia Education (NAE)
International Baccalaureate (IB)

Athletics
The school is a member of the Florida High School Athletic Association.

Notable alumni

 Kevin Austin Jr., American football player
 Brandon Doughty, American football player
 Ariana Grande, singer, songwriter, and actress
 Sammis Reyes, Chilean-born basketball and American football player

References

External links

 

Private K-12 schools in Florida
Schools in Broward County, Florida
Educational institutions established in 1957
1957 establishments in Florida
Preparatory schools in Florida
Coconut Creek, Florida
Nord Anglia Education
Boarding schools in Florida